The NER Class W was a class of ten 4-6-0T locomotives built by the North Eastern Railway at their Gateshead Works between 1907 and 1908. They were all rebuilt as Class W1 4-6-2T locomotives between 1914 and 1917.

The ten locomotives were built in one batch, and were numbered 686 to 695. They were designed for the Scarborough to Whitby line, on which the  Class O 0-4-4T locomotives then in use were having difficulty with the traffic, especially the three-mile section of 1 in 40 (2.5%). However, the low fuel and water capacity was a barrier to operational efficiency, and so between September 1914 and January 1917 the whole class was rebuilt as 4–6–2T locomotives and reclassified W1.

Only one batch was built as the design was soon superseded by the Class D 4-4-4T.

References

 

W0
4-6-0T locomotives
Railway locomotives introduced in 1907
Scrapped locomotives
Standard gauge steam locomotives of Great Britain

Passenger locomotives